The New Party (Turkish: Yeni Parti) is a political party in Northern Cyprus. At the last legislative elections for the House of Representatives of Northern Cyprus - held on 20 January 2005, the party won 1.6% of the popular vote and 0 out of 50 seats. Its candidate, Nuri Çevikel took at the Northern Cyprus presidential elections of 17 April 2005 4.8% of the votes.

Political parties in Northern Cyprus